Judy Dempsey is an Irish journalist and international relations researcher. She is a non-resident Senior Fellow at Carnegie Europe, and has been editor-in-chief for Carnegie Europe's Strategic Europe blog. She has been a guest contributor to the Washington Post, has contributed to The World on PRX and has also written for The Guardian, The International Herald Tribune and The New York Times. In 2014 she was awarded the Officer's Cross (4th class) of the Order of Merit of the Republic of Poland for "outstanding services in supporting democratic changes in Poland, for promoting Poland to the world".

References

External links

Journalists from Dublin (city)
International relations scholars
Irish women journalists
Irish columnists
Irish women columnists
1956 births
Officers of the Order of Merit of the Republic of Poland
Alumni of Trinity College Dublin
Living people